Cistus munbyi is a shrubby species of flowering plant in the family Cistaceae, with white flowers. Related to and resembling Cistus clusii, it is native to Morocco and Algeria in western north Africa.

Description
The upper surfaces of the leaves are smooth, the lower surfaces have a dense covering of short stellate hairs. It has white flowers. C. munbyi resembles C. clusii, but the flower-bearing branches are longer and the flower stalks (peduncles) and sepals are covered with white hairs, making them appear silky ("sericeus").

Taxonomy
Giles Munby gave a description of this species under the name Cistus sericeus in 1847. The name had already been published by Martin Vahl in 1790, so that Munby's name is illegitimate. Auguste Nicolas Pomel published the currently used name in 1874, the specific epithet munbyi honouring Munbyi.

Phylogeny
Molecular phylogenetic studies place C. munbyi in a clade with Cistus clusii within the larger white and whitish pink clade of Cistus species, sister to all the remaining white and whitish pink flowered species.

Distribution and habitat
Cistus munbyi is native to western north Africa, occurring at elevations of up to  along the Mediterranean coasts of Morocco and Algeria. It occurs in dry, sunny locations, generally in alkaline soils among bushy vegetation. Munby's description was based on a specimen from the cliffs east of Oran.

References

munbyi
Plants described in 1874
Flora of North Africa